Arthur, malédiction ( Arthur, curse) is a 2022 French meta psychological horror film directed by Barthélemy Grossmann. It is the fourth installment in the Arthur film series, which is based on the children's fantasy novel series of the same name by Luc Besson, and a spin-off to the trilogy. A standalone film, it is not part of the same continuity as the previous films and is set in the real world.

The film stars Mathieu Berger, Thalia Besson, Lola Andreoni, Mikaël Halimi, Yann Mendy, Jade Pedri, Vadim Agid, and Marceau Ebersolt, and follows a group of adolescent Arthur fans who discover the house which served as one of the film trilogy live-action sequences film set. However, during their weekend trip, the group find themselves being hunted down one by one by a group of deranged role-players. Production secretly started in 2020 in Normandy. It is the first Arthur film to be rated "prohibited to spectators under 12 years old" by the French Cinematographic Works Classification Board and the first to be filmed in French language.

Arthur, malédiction was released in France on 29 June 2022 by Apollo Films. It was poorly received by critics, and grossed only 1 million € against a 2 million € budget, making it a box-office bomb.

Plot

8-year-old Alex, Samantha, Jean, Mathilde, Renata, Maxime, Douglas and Dominique watch the film trilogy Arthur. After the end of the third film, Alex's mother puts the children to sleep, and wishes her son a happy birthday. Alex then tells his mother what his dream is: to become a Minimoy.

Ten years later, 18-year-old Alex tries to escape the gendarmes, while he is disguised as Arthur. For their part, Jean, Renata, Maxime, Dominique, Douglas and Mathilde then prepare the party for Alex's birthday. The latter arrives at his home after having escaped the gendarmes. Samantha then arrives disguised as Princess Selenia, which surprises Alex. The evening begins. Friends eat cake. Alex opens all the presents offered by his friends then goes to the room with Samantha to discuss. Maxime picks them up to come and watch the films of the saga. The group of friends then watches Luc Besson's trilogy, then gathers around the table to eat. Samantha announces a surprise to Alex: her friends have found the house that was used as a film set for the live-action sequences. Alex is in disbelief, until his friends show him a video sent by their friends Momo and Pilou, where we see them in front of the famous house. The whole gang of friends leaves the next day to find the house.

After several hours on the road, the teenagers stop in a quiet little town to buy food. The inhabitants observe them, from their arrival until their departure. After getting back on the road, Renata stops near a house to ask for directions. They ring the house bell while Mathilde takes pictures. She then notices a human foot torn off and hanging from a clothesline; when she tries to photograph it, several dogs rip it down. The inhabitant of the house comes and asks them what they are doing. The teenagers tell him that they are looking for the house that was used for the filming of the film Arthur and the Minimoys. The inhabitant, now seeming paranoid, tells them that the area around the house is dangerous, and that they should turn around and leave. When they protest, he returns with a shotgun, and fires a shell into the air to make them leave.

Undeterred, the group of friends manage to find a road which will lead them to the house, but are forced to stop in the forest, due to a fallen tree blocking the road. Alex and the others continue down the route on foot, while Renata leaves a trail of ribbons behind them to mark the path back to their car. The friends find the house and start taking pictures. They discover that the objects used in the filming are still there. Alex, Samantha, Maxime and Dominique then find a hatch that leads to the basement, while Jean, Mathilde, Douglas and Renata go upstairs to explore the rest of the house. Jean discovers that the rails of the train appearing in the film are still there too, as well as the make-up. They then find Momo and Pilou's camping equipment, and wonder where they are. Maxime and Dominique go upstairs to join the others, while Alex, Samantha, Maxime and Dominique continue to explore the basement. Alex and Samantha split up from Maxime and Dominique and find a blocked door, which they try to open without success. They start to go back to meet up with the rest of the group but are scared by Jean, who has put himself in full make-up to look like a character from the film.

Alex, Samantha, and the others set up camp near the house before going off to try and find Momo and Pilou. As it starts to get dark, the group goes into the forest to find firewood, having fun together and toasting to Alex's birthday. Dominique breaks off from the group and finds Momo's phone. Alex and the others begin to worrying about Momo, but continue to party nonetheless. While going to bed, Alex and Samantha mutually confess their feelings and kiss. In the night, Alex is awakened by a nightmare where he sees Momo, Pilou and himself being attacked by strangers. Leaving the tent, he notices lights coming from the distant forest, as well as several people. Thinking it is Momo, he calls out, but he gets no response and the lights suddenly go out.

The next day, the teenagers discover the cooler overturned, and their food eaten. Douglas thinks a bear might have done this, while the others tell him there are no bears in the area. Douglas is sent to the car so that he can take it back to town and buy new supplies, while Dominique and Maxime go swimming in the river in the forest. Douglas follows the ribbons Renata had hung from the trees to find the way back to the cars, but comes across a strange tree where a person seems to be stuck inside. As he approaches the tree, an unseen person knocks him unconscious. As Maxime and Dominique are resting by the river, they discover Momo's unconscious body, hanging upside down from a tree. Maxime, while trying to unhook the rope attached to Momo's foot, is caught in a bear trap. Dominique arrives to free Maxime's foot from the trap, and begins cutting down the ropes suspending Momo, but once freed, he plummets to his death. Meanwhile, the rest of the group find the hole used for the filming which, in the movies, was the gateway to the kingdom of the Minimoys. They tie Jean and the camera together with a rope and start lowering it into the hole to see how deep it goes. They then observe something strange that rips the camera away, pulling Jean into the hole. Alex cuts the rope that connects Jean to the camera and saves his friend.

Renata angrily tells Alex that they should all go home after what happened. But in the distance, they notice Dominique, carrying Maxime on his back and who ends up falling to the ground. After being joined by the group, Dominique explains to Alex that Momo is dead and begs him to leave. After treating Maxime, Alex, Jean and Dominique bring him to the cars, leaving Samantha, Mathilde and Renata at home. As they arrive at the car, they find that a log has fallen on Renata's vehicle and Douglas has gotten lost in the forest. While Alex and Jean are looking for him, they leave Dominique and Maxime behind in Jean's car with instructions to honk every two minutes to make sure they are okay, and to honk several times in case of problem. At home, Renata and Samantha sit on a swing to listen to music.

Mathilde then looks at the photos she has taken with her camera and notices in the photos that a person is watching them from the window upstairs in the house; when she turns her head to observe the window, she then sees that the person is still observing her. To be safe, she locks herself in the barn, but sees through the door that a person is lurking around the barn. She climbs onto the roof, which attracts a whole honeycomb towards Mathilde, who is allergic to bee stings. Stuck in the barn, she breaks the window to try to get out but succumbs to her allergy. Alex and Jean, still in the forest looking for Douglas, find the latter with his hands clinging to a tree. As Jean approaches him, he notices that his arms are ripped off, signifying Douglas' death. Dominique, watching over Maxime, notices that strangers are approaching the car; he then honks several times to signal the danger to Alex and Jean, but someone breaks the car window. In the distance, Alex and Jean hear the cries of their friends, but, soon enough, they are already dead. Alex and Jean therefore head towards the house to alert Renata and Samantha.

In the distance, Xander calls Samantha telling her to get away as soon as possible, but the person who has been watching them all along cuts the wire of the swing she is sitting on, causing her to fall into a tunnel under the house. Xander, Jean, and Renata cast a fluorescent light to locate her and grab a rope to bring her to the surface, but a hand grabs Samantha's foot and drags her down with her into the basement. Alex and Jean therefore immediately go to the basement to try to find her and, while crossing a tube, Alex falls on Pilou's lifeless body, but finds Samantha, alive and made up with paint like in the film. Jean announces to Renata, who remained on the ground floor, that they have found Samantha; as she catches her breath, a person who had confused themselves with the walls of the house with paint on her body, approaches her and kidnaps her. As they head back downstairs, Jean, Samantha, and Alex lay on the floor, taking a deep breath, but upon hearing footsteps, Alex turns around and gets knocked out with a punch.

Kidnapped by people dressed as Matassalai, characters from the Arthur trilogy, Alex, Samantha, Renata and Jean regain consciousness while they are tied up. A Matassalai approaches Alex telling him that the moon is full and that he is ready to join the world of the Minimoys, Jean tries to find a plan and cut the rope that keeps them prisoners. As the Matassalai pull on the vines to send Alex into the world of the Minimoys, as in the second part of the saga, Jean arrives to rescue her friend with Renata while Samantha leaves to seek help.

As she tries to get the Matassalai's attention, several people disguised as Minions (the minions of Maltazard in the movies) arrive, armed with knives, and one of them stabs Renata who bleeds out. A fight between the Matassalai and the Minions then begins. Alex tries to escape from the vines that hold him prisoner and Jean fights with a Matassalai, which knocks him out. As he is about to finish him off, Alex arrives and stabs the Matassalai in the back with a spear. After escaping, Samantha comes across a figure, which turns out to be a person disguised as Maltazard, the villain of the Arthur and the Invisibles movies. As she flees, she is caught by Maltazard, who tries to strangle her to death, but she is saved by the paranoid inhabitant of the house, whom the gang had met to ask directions. Shooting Maltazard with his rifle, he then kills the Matassalai and the remaining Minions. He then approaches Alex telling him that he told them not to approach this house because it was dangerous; he then threatens Alex by pointing his gun to his head, and tells him not to set foot in that house again, which Alex accepts. The inhabitant of the house leaves and leaves them in the middle of the corpses, but the police and the emergency services arrive to save them.

In the morning, the police, who have completely secured the place, announce to them the death of Mathilde and informs Alex, Samantha, and Jean that the bodies of their friends will be repatriated. The police also explain to them that their attackers were just a bunch of out-of-town, drug-addicted kids who played deadly role-playing games like Batman vs. Superman, but they started playing Arthur and the Invisibles after discovering the house that was filmed. When getting into a police van that will take them to the hospital, Alex notices an individual at the window of the top floor of the house watching them. After they leave, the house and the field around it are surrounded by police and medical examiners, dealing with the corpses of the Matassalai and the Minions, as well as those of Mathilde, Renata, Douglas, Dominique and Maxime but also the band member, disguised as Maltazard.

Cast
 Mathieu Berger as Alex
 Thalia Besson as Samantha
 Lola Andreoni as Mathilde
 Mikaël Halimi as Douglas
 Yann Mendy as Jean
 Jade Pedri as Renata
 Vadim Agid as Maxime
 Marceau Ebersolt as Dominique
 Ludovic Berthillot

Production
Principal photography began in secret in the summer 2020 in Normandy, where the original films were filmed and using the same house, between the first and second lockdown during the COVID-19 pandemic. It lasted 33 days.

Release
Arthur, malédiction was released in France on 29 June 2022 by Apollo Films and EuropaCorp Distribution. It is the first film in the Arthur series that EuropaCorp co-distribute with another company.

Reception

Few press titles have looked at the viewing of the film, which reflects a lack of appetite for this horror film taken from the world of Minimoys. For les Inrockuptibles, . Large Screen and Télérama are both very incisive with regard to this film. For the first, ; for the second, they witness .

Controversies
Shortly after its release, several students from the École de la Cité, a film school founded by Besson, denounced what they alleged were unrespectable writing and filming practices. A former student of the Cité school detailed the vexations, dangers, and abuses of working with Besson, who they further accused of taking advantage of his students' inexperience. On Twitter, Arthur Reudet, a young assistant-director and alumn of the Cité school, without explicitly accusing Besson of plagiarism, remarked that Arthur, malédiction had several similarities with a short film he directed in 2017, based on the same screenplay, starring Shannah Besson, one of Luc Besson's daughters.

References

External links 
 

2022 films
2022 horror thriller films
2022 psychological thriller films
2020s French films
2020s French-language films
2020s psychological horror films
EuropaCorp films
Film controversies
Film controversies in France
Film spin-offs
Films based on children's books
Films involved in plagiarism controversies
Films produced by Luc Besson
Films shot in Normandy
Films with screenplays by Luc Besson
French horror thriller films
French psychological horror films
French psychological thriller films
Horror films based on children's franchises
Metafictional works